Boontling is a jargon or argot spoken only in Boonville in Northern California of the United States. It was created in the 1890s. Today, it is nearly extinct, and fewer than 100 people still speak it. It has an Internet Assigned Numbers Authority (IANA) sub-tag of boont (i.e. en-boont). The lingo has become somewhat infamous, at least in local circles or within the legends of California, owing to its small-town nature and curious-sounding nomination, as well as its very limited speakership.

The language gained attention in the 1960s and 1970s from researchers like  Myrtle R. Rawles and  Charles C. Adams, as well as publicity brought from Boontling-speaker Bobby (Chipmunk) Glover and historian  Jack (Wee Fuzz) June.

History and description
Although Boontling is based on English, many of its unusual words are unique to Boonville, California.  Scottish Gaelic and Irish, and some Pomoan and Spanish words also contribute to this jargon.  Boontling was invented in the late 19th century and had quite a following at the turn of the 20th century.  It is now mostly spoken by aging counter-culturists and native Anderson Valley residents.  Because the town of Boonville has only a little more than 700 residents, Boontling is an extremely esoteric jargon, and is quickly becoming archaic.  It has over a thousand unique words and phrases.

Origins
The Anderson Valley, of which Boonville is the largest town, was an isolated farming, ranching, and logging community during the late 19th century. There are several differing versions as to the origin of Boontling. Some assert that the jargon was created by the women, children, and young men in the hop fields and sheep shearing sheds as a means of recreation, and that it spread through the community as the children continued using it when they grew up. Myrtle R. Rawles explains that Boontling was started by the children of Boonville as a language game which enabled them to speak freely in front of elders without being understood. It is believed that the jargon originated from Ed (Squirrel) Clement and Lank McGimsey, circa 1890.

Documentation
Based on interviews of family and neighbors, Myrtle Rawles wrote an article, "'Boontling': Esoteric Speech of Boonville, California," published in 1966 by the California Folklore Society (presently Western States Folklore Society) in Western Folklore, Volume 25, No. 2, and reprinted under the title Boontling, or the strange Boonville language by the Mendocino County Historical Society in 1967. Researcher Charles C. Adams studied the lingo in the 1960s and wrote a doctoral dissertation based on his research. In 1971 University of Texas Press published his book, Boontling: an American Lingo, which included an extensive dictionary.

Boontling briefly enjoyed a national audience in the mid-1970s when a Boontling speaker named Bobby (Chipmunk) Glover was a regular guest on the well-known The Tonight Show Starring Johnny Carson on the NBC television network. Boontling historian Jack (Wee Fuzz) June appeared on the game show To Tell the Truth. Because Boontling is a spoken jargon rather than a written one, spellings of its words vary greatly. Most spellings were not formalized until the 1970s, primarily by the writings of Jack (Wee Fuzz) June.

A
  – to butt or crowd in so as to push a person out of line and take his or her place.
  – a sawmill.
  – a young girl; girlfriend or wife.
  – to wreck something: an anagram, probably from "wreck".

B
 back-dated chuck – a person who is ignorant or behind the times
 bahl – good, great
 bahlness – a very attractive woman
 barlow – a knife: taken from the trade name Barlow knife.
 bat – to masturbate.
 batter – a bachelor; a masturbator.
 bearman – a story teller: Allen Cooper, an innkeeper, who was a bear hunter and a story teller.
 beelch – sexual intercourse.
 bee hunter – a free spirited Valley girl
 beemsch – good show: a blend of bahl (good) and show.
 beeson tree – a stock saddle: Beeson was a trade name.
 beeljeck – a rabbit: a blend of Belgian hare and jack rabbit.
 belhoon – a dollar.
 bilch – sexual intercourse.
 Bill Nunn – syrup; a sobriquet: Bill Nunn put syrup on nearly everything he ate.
 bird-stock – a man with a large family.
 blooch – to prattle on, to talk aimlessly.
 bloocher – a 'bullshitter'; also, a masturbator.
 blue-birded – to be bucked off a horse: One of the boys got bucked off a horse and afterwards *said, "I got thrown so high that a blue-bird could have built a nest on my ass."
 blue grass – whiskey.
 blue-tail – a rattlesnake.
 boo – a potato. [from the Pomo Indian bu]
 booker, or Booker T – A person of African American descent: from the well known Booker T. Washington
 Boont – Boonville.
 boont [verb] – to speak Boontling
 bootjack – a coyote. (From the v-shape of their ears, resembling a bootjack.)
 borch – a person of Chinese descent: a blend or possibly a euphemism for boar Chinese.
 borego – see: breggo
 borp – a hog; a boar pig.
 boshe – a deer.
 boshe gun – a .30–30 caliber rifle used to hunt deer.
 boshe hareem or boshin' hareem – a deer hunting dog or hound.
 boshin' – deer hunting
 bow – to dare or challenge to fight.
 bowgley – a 'whopper' of a lie
 branching – stepping out for a good time.
 branding irons – hand cuffs.
 breggo – a sheep. [from the Spanish borrego]
 Brightlighter – An outsider. Anyone not from Boonville.
 briny – the coast.
 broadly – a cow.
 Bucket of Blood – nickname of a Boonville bar known for its brawls.
 bucky – a nickel.
 bucky walter – a pay phone. Derived from the fact that a call cost a nickel at the time. See also "walter".
 buck-inj – a person of Native Indian descent: a blend of buck-Indian.
 buck pasture – refers to the predicament of a man with a pregnant wife.
 burlapping – having sexual intercourse: from an incident in which a local couple was discovered making love on a heap of burlap sacks in the back room of a store.

C
 can-kicky – angry.
 chap ports – chaps: from the Spanish word Chaparajos.
 charl – to milk a cow.
 Charlie – to embarrass: from a Native American named Charlie Ball was noted for his *bashfulness.
 Charlied – embarrassed.
 Charlie Balled – bashful.
 cheaters – glasses or spectacles
 chigrel – (n.) a food or a meal; (vrb.) to eat: blend of child's gruel.
 chipmunk – to hoard; to save.
 Cloverdal – Cloverdale: the nearest town to the south.
 cloddies – heavy shoes: from clodhoppers, sturdy or cumbersome shoes.
 cocked – to become angry: like cocking a gun.
 cocked darley – a man with a gun.
 comoshe – a tool to grind sheep shears: a moshe was a machine with a motor.
 condeal or canned eel – a country job: blend of country deal.
 cow skully – a desolate area.
 crazeek – crazy.
 croppies – a sheep.
 cyke or sike – a horse: from Cyclone, the name of a local horse that was hard to ride.

D
 deepend – Navarro, the 'deep end' of the valley
 deeger – a degenerate person.
 deejy – (adj.) degenerate, generally in reference to a person.
 deek – to notice or call attention to.
 dehigged – to be broke as in not having money.
 dicking – cheating, generally at cards.
 dishing – rushing or pushing in to be first.
 dissies – shoes with metal buckles.
 dissies stool – the stool of repentance for a drunk; the state of being on the water wagon.
 donicker or donagher – a toilet or rest-room.
 Drearies – the Bald Hills, a local spot.
 dreek – whip.
 dreeked – whipped.
 dreeking – a whipping.
 dulcey – a sweet: From the Spanish word dulce meaning sweet.
 dukes – fists.

E
 eatin' lizards - referring to someone or an animal that is unhealthily skinny: comes from when feral cats eat the local lizards in the valley, they get extremely sickly skinny.
 eeld'm – an old woman (not complimentary): blend for old dame.
 Ee-tah – an exclamation: considered a version of the old rebel yell that went into many Civil War battles. Many Boonters were originally from the South and made no secret of their rebel sympathies.
 equalizer – a gun
 eesole – an undesirable or questionable character: this is considered a disguised pronunciation or euphemism.

F
 fair and right a person – one who would give or lend money.
 fiddlers – delirium tremens.
 fister – a fight.
 forbes – a half dollar: four bits.
 Frati – wine: Mr. Frati was a local vineyardist.

G
 gannow – apple: Spanish for a type of apple (gano).
 glimmer – a kerosene lamp.
 glow worm – a lantern.
 gorm – to eat or overeat: from the French word gourmandise meaning to eat greedily.
 greeley – a newspaper, or a newspaper reporter, perhaps from famous newspaperman Horace Greeley.
 greeny – loss of temper; to throw a greeny or temper tantrum.

H
 haireem – a dog. (From "hairy mouth", since Airedale Terriers were popular in Anderson Valley.)
 harp – to talk.
 harpin' tidrick – a lengthy discussion, especially in Boontling (see also: tidrick).
 hedge – a haircut.
 heelch – all; everything: A greedy person when invited to share food and drink would take the heelch: possibly from "whole cheese".
 high gun – to beat to the draw.
 high heel – to arrest. The local sheriff had one leg shorter than the other so he wore one high-heeled boot.
 high heeler – an arresting officer.
 high pockets – a person of wealth: the wealthiest man in the area was six feet six inches tall.
 high pockety – rich; having money.
 high roller – someone from neighboring Yorkville.
 higgs – money.
 higged or higgied – having money.
 hob or hobneelch- a Saturday night dance. (From the hobnailed boots that were popular in the valley.)
 hog rings – a large vagina.
 hood – a peculiar person; person different from the ordinary: a new family moved into the valley and the children wore hoods all day long.
 hoot – to laugh.
 hooter – a loud laugher.
 horn – a drink of liquor.
 horn of zeese – a drink of coffee. See also "zeese".

I
 itch neem'r – without desire to drink: one would say, "I itch neem'r"
 Ite – an Italian

J
 jape – to drive, generally a car.
 japer – a driver of a car.
 Jeffer – a fire, generally a big fire: Jeff Vestal, owner of the Boonville Hotel, built big fires in the parlor and elsewhere.
 Jenny Beck – a tattletale; a stool pigeon: Jenny Beck was a local gossiper and told many tall-tales.
 Jay Esser – a lawsuit: from a well known lawsuit between J.S. Ornbaun et al.

K
 keishbook – an Indian word, meaning a pregnant woman.
 killing snake – to work very hard at something: One would say "He's tackling that job as if he were killing snake."
 kimmie – a man, more often applied to a stranger. (From: "Come here, you.")
 kimoshe – a strange vehicle.
 kingster – an expensive church: George Singley, whose nickname was King George, donated liberally to the church building fund.

L
 lengthy – a doe deer.
 Levi – to telephone: Walter Levi was the first to make use of the telephone in Boont. See also "walter", "bucky walter".
 lizzie – pregnant.
 locking – a wedding.
 locking match – an anticipated wedding; engagement to marry.
 log lifter – a heavy winter storm.

M
 Madge – a prostitute: Madge was a brothel madame in Ukiah.
 madging – visiting the house of prostitution.
 Mason Dixon – division between Boonville and Philo: In the early days a feud almost existed between the two communities.
 mate – either the male or female sex organs
 mate gormin' – oral/genital contact, i.e., either cunnilingus or fellatio
 mink – an expensively dressed girl or woman; a wearer of fur.
 modocker – a gay, lesbian or bi-sexual person.
 Moldune – an overly large woman. (e.g., to hit the moldune trail – to have an affair with a woman).
 Moldunes – breasts, especially very large ones.
 Mollies – see: moldunes.
 Molly gormin' – oral contact with the female breasts.
 Moshe – Machine. Generally used to refer to an automobile.
 Mouse ear – a tight vagina.
 Muzz Creek – excess of water in gutters.

N
 nettied – all dressed up; wearing an abundance of lace, ribbons, and finery.
 nonch – no good; bad: blend of "not much".

O
 old dame – a man's wife.
 old dusties – hell.
 oshtook – a person with one eye: a Native American word.
 Otto – to work hard: from a local hard working German settler whose given name was Otto.
 Kai - Coyote

P
 pack-em-out-billies – dirty socks.
 paper skull – a small deer.
 Peak'ed Heads – members of Oddfellows' Lodge, usually used by non-members.
 peeril – to rain.
 pearlin – light rain.
 pick-em-up – (1) a person starting a fight; (2) a method of breaking a horse by elevating one foot.
 pike – to go; to travel.
 pusseek – a female cat.

R
 rack – a raccoon
 rawncher – exceptionally large
 region – one's house or home.
 relf – a rail fence.
 ridgy – old fashioned; back-woodsy.
 rout the kimmie in the boat – to impregnate a woman

S
 seertail or sirtle – a salmon.
 sharkin' or sharkin' match – fighting; also used to describe Boontlingers attempting to out-do each other by coming up with a new word.
 shoveltooth – a medical doctor. [after a local doctor who had protruding front teeth]
 skee – whiskey
 skype – a preacher. (From "Sky Pilot.")
 sol – the sun, from the Spanish
 Sol's grandmother or Saul's grandmother – dead.
 somersetting – being overemotional or sentimental; head-over-heels. (From "turned somerset.")
 spat – a .22 caliber rimfire rifle.
 steedos – a stallion; stud horse.
 stiff hat – professional fighters.
 straight neck – a person of German descent.
 sunnies – pretty; sunny day.

T
 teebow – deaf.
 telefe – to telephone; a telephone.
 thorps – a man's button shoes.
 tidrick – a party; a social gathering
 tobe – tobacco.
 toobs or tubes – twenty five cents; two bits.
 trash mover – a heavy rainstorm.
 Trojan – dynamite: Trojan is a brand name of dynamite.
 trilbies – shoes, probably dress shoes.
 tuddies – crazy.
 tuddish – slow-thinking.
 tuffer – a sheep hard to shear; a tough one.
 tweed – a child; a teenager.

U
 Uke – Ukiah.  Also Uke Language… Predating Boontling, originating out of the Mendocino State Insane Asylum located in Talmage California… Ever wondered why they Removed the D in Talmadge to Talmage?… Look up Benjamin Tallmadge.

W
 walter – a telephone. Named after Walter Levi, the first person in town to have one installed.
 weese – a small child; an infant
 Wes – a harmless fish.
 Wheeler – a fit; a tantrum.
 wilk – a wild cat.

Z
 zeese – coffee: Zachariah Clifton "Z.C." or Zeese Blevens was a coffee drinker who liked his coffee strong.

See also
 Californian English
 Chinook Jargon
 Dialect
 Speech community

References

Sources
 Rawles, Myrtle R. (1966); "'Boontling': Esoteric Language of Boonville, California." In Western Folklore, Vol. 25, No. 2, pp. 93–103. California Folklore Society [Western States Folklore Society].

Further reading
 Boontling: An American Lingo, by Charles Adams, .
 A Slib of Lorey (translation: A bit of folklore) by Edna Sanders
 English to Boontling by Judy Belshe-Toernblom. Published by JudyBelshe@aol.com

External links
 Boontling: An American Lingo
 History of Boontling at the Anderson Valley Museum
 Mendocino Middle School Boontling Dictionary
 Haddock, Vicki. "Hamlet's Dying Lingo" in San Francisco Chronicle, February 5, 2001.
 Voices of The Valley (Anderson Valley): Bobby Glover
 Boontling Language of Boonville
 

American English
California culture
English-based argots
Mendocino County, California